Syed Muhammed Abul Faiz (known as SMA Faiz) is a Bangladeshi academic. He served as the 26th vice-chancellor of the University of Dhaka serving from September 2002 until January 2009. Though an academic and a scientific researcher by profession, Faiz  was also the chairman of the Public Service Commission of Bangladesh before his tenure as the vice-chancellor.

Early life and education
With a bygone ancestry in the district of 24 Parganas at West Bengal State in India, Faiz was brought up in Dhaka mostly. His father AKKB Syed Muhammed Hasan Ali did his graduation from the Presidency College in India. He was a civil servant in the then East Pakistan and retired from his services as a Magistrate in Dhaka. His mother was UN Jobeda Khatun. In his school and college life in Dhaka, Faiz was not a bookish but often a "hooky" type. However, the average grade in the examinations were good enough for his admission at the Medical College in Dhaka, to fulfill his father's desire. But his stint as a medical student lasted only for about four months by which time he developed a serious dislike of practical anatomy. He got himself admitted at the University of Dhaka in the same year, albeit rather late. He was more intent on making good results which was evident in his bachelor's degree, and also in the master's result in Soil Science in 1968.  In December 1970, Faiz went to UK for doing research leading to Ph.D. and obtained the degree in Soil: Plant Water Relations from the Department of Botany, University of Aberdeen, under the supervision of Regius Professor P.E. Weatherley, Fellow of the Royal Society. He came back to a newly independent Bangladesh in March 1973 after completing his Ph.D. in little more than 2 years time.

Teaching career

Faiz joined the Department of Soil Science, University of Dhaka as an assistant professor on 2 July 1973 and became an associate professor in 1977. He worked as reader (British equivalent to associate professor) in the University of Maidugari, Nigeria for about 4 years before becoming a professor  in the Department of Soil Science, Dhaka University in 1986. Prof. Faiz served as the chairman of the Department of Soil Science (Now Department of Soil, Water and Environment) during 1988 to 1991, and also worked as the elected Dean of the Faculty of Biological Sciences, Dhaka University during 1991 to 1993. Faiz  was an elected member of Dhaka University Senate and Syndicate. He was the provost of Hazi Md. Mohsin Hall for few years. He writes about higher education sector regularly now.

Various leadership and publication
Faiz was the elected president of the Dhaka University Teachers Association, and the president of the Federation of Bangladesh University Teachers Associations, consisting of all the public universities of Bangladesh. In 1993 Faiz restyled his career when appointed as the chairman of the Bangladesh Public Service Commission (P.S.C) by the president of the country. The constitutional position he held in this quasi-judicial body during 1993 to 1998 gave him the responsibility of selecting suitable candidates for different Civil Service Cadres of the Government, among other things. He was only about 45 years of age before becoming the youngest ever chairman of P.S.C. He came back to the university in 1998 and in 2002 became the 26th vice-chancellor of the University of Dhaka and served in that capacity till early 2009. Faiz has published more than 100 scientific papers in national and international journals. Some of his works were highlighted in books published from London by the McGrow- Hill, and the Academic Press. He was one of the editors of a book entitled Climate Change and Food Security in South Asia published from the Netherlands by Springer. Prof. Faiz was the chairman of the trustee board of the Bangladesh National Museum for over 5 years and also served as chairman of the trustee board of the Foundation for Research on Educational Planning and Development (FREPD) for over 6 years. Faiz retired from his services at the University of Dhaka in 2014. At present, Faiz is associated with a private university named State University of Bangladesh with which he had an emotional attachment since inception.

References

Living people
Academic staff of the University of Dhaka
University of Dhaka alumni
Alumni of the University of Aberdeen
Vice-Chancellors of the University of Dhaka
Year of birth missing (living people)
Place of birth missing (living people)
Bangladeshi people of Indian descent